Jérôme Baugnies (born 1 April 1987) is a Belgian cyclist, who rides for Belgian amateur team .

Major results

2004
 7th Paris–Roubaix Juniors
2005
 3rd Paris–Roubaix Juniors
2006
 2nd Grand Prix Criquielion
 8th Liège–Bastogne–Liège U23
2007
 1st Stage 5 (TTT) Volta a Lleida
 4th Paris–Tours Espoirs
2008
 1st Grote Prijs Beeckman-De Caluwé
 2nd Road race, National Under-23 Road Championships
 2nd Ronde van Vlaanderen U23
 5th Liège–Bastogne–Liège U23
 5th Flèche Ardennaise
 6th Romsée–Stavelot–Romsée
 8th Kattekoers
2009
 5th Road race, UCI Under-23 Road World Championships
 5th Memorial Van Coningsloo
 5th Flèche Ardennaise
2010
 3rd Tre Valli Varesine
2011
 2nd Eschborn-Frankfurt City Loop
 8th Circuito de Getxo
2013
 1st  Road race, National Amateur Road Championships
 1st Kattekoers
 3rd Grand Prix Impanis-Van Petegem
 3rd Grand Prix de la ville de Nogent-sur-Oise
 4th Omloop Het Nieuwsblad Beloften
 4th Memorial Van Coningsloo
 5th Ronde van Limburg
 6th Overall Ronde de l'Oise
 10th Internationale Wielertrofee Jong Maar Moedig
2014
 2nd Giro di Toscana
 3rd Overall Tour des Fjords
1st Stage 1
 3rd Grand Prix of Aargau Canton
 3rd Eschborn-Frankfurt City Loop
 4th GP Industria & Artigianato di Larciano
 6th Tour de Vendée
 7th Overall La Tropicale Amissa Bongo
1st Stage 2
 7th Druivenkoers Overijse
 9th Overall Tour of Norway
2015
 1st Druivenkoers Overijse
 2nd Tour du Finistère
 6th Internationale Wielertrofee Jong Maar Moedig
 7th Binche–Chimay–Binche
 10th Grand Prix de Wallonie
2016
 1st Druivenkoers Overijse
 1st Internationale Wielertrofee Jong Maar Moedig
 1st  Sprints classification Vuelta a Andalucía
 2nd Overall Rhône-Alpes Isère Tour
1st Stage 3
 2nd Grand Prix Pino Cerami
 3rd Grand Prix de Wallonie
 10th Grand Prix d'Ouverture La Marseillaise
2017
 1st Druivenkoers Overijse
 3rd Grote Prijs Jean-Pierre Monseré
 3rd De Kustpijl
 4th Dwars door de Vlaamse Ardennen
 8th Overall Tour de Luxembourg
 8th Volta Limburg Classic
 9th Internationale Wielertrofee Jong Maar Moedig
2018
 1st Internationale Wielertrofee Jong Maar Moedig
 1st Grote Prijs Stad Zottegem
 2nd Grand Prix Pino Cerami
 3rd Overall Rhône-Alpes Isère Tour
 3rd Tacx Pro Classic
 4th Dwars door het Hageland
 5th Grand Prix de la Ville de Lillers
 6th Volta Limburg Classic
2019
 9th Grote Prijs Stad Zottegem

References

External links

1987 births
Living people
Belgian male cyclists
People from Soignies
Cyclists from Hainaut (province)